Moskorzew  is a village in Włoszczowa County, Świętokrzyskie Voivodeship, in south-central Poland. It is the seat of the gmina (administrative district) called Gmina Moskorzew.

The village has a population of 644.

References

Villages in Włoszczowa County
Kielce Governorate
Kielce Voivodeship (1919–1939)